Grewia umbellifera is a small, scandent shrub of the family Malvaceae which is native to India.

References

External links

umbellifera